Agwa de Bolivia, often shortened to AGWA, is a herbal liqueur made with Bolivian coca leaves and 37 other natural herbs and botanicals including green tea, ginseng, and guarana, distilled and produced in Amsterdam by BABCO Europe Limited. The coca leaf content of the drink, like that in Coca-Cola, has the cocaine alkaloids removed during production, and does not contain the drug.

History
The AGWA brand claims a longstanding heritage that honors traditional Bolivian coca leaf liqueurs, the first of which was produced by the De Medici family in Bologna in 1820. Previous to this, however, the coca leaf had been used for thousands of years by the native South American population. However, they for the most part chewed the leaf; by comparison, the making of alcoholic drinks was of a more limited scope. These older variants of the liqueur were enjoyed by many in anecdotal accounts, including Rudyard Kipling, who described the drink as being made "from the clippings and shavings of angels' wings". AGWA itself claims to build upon this long-standing tradition of coca leaf infused liquor.

Production
The leaves used for the production of AGWA are picked at 2000 metres above sea level in the Andes. The leaves are then shipped under armed guard to Amsterdam, where they are distilled to a strength of 78-88% alc./vol. and 36 other botanical elements are added. This distillate is then reduced to 30% ABV.

Legality
Agwa de Bolivia has been approved for consumption by the European Union Narcotics commission, U.S. Food and Drug Administration, and TTB (Homeland security finished liquid & label).

Museum
AGWA also plays an integral role in the coca leaf museum in Amsterdam. The museum deals with the history of the coca leaf from its use in ancient rituals to the modern day use of it in the illegal drug trade.

Awards
 2009 Silver (best in class) award in the herbal liqueur class at the International Wine and Spirit Awards.
 2011 Silver Medal in the herbal liqueur class at the San Francisco World Spirits Competition.

See also
 Vin Mariani

References

External links 
 

Liqueurs
Alcoholic drink brands
Energy drinks